Axl Hazarika is an Indian avant-garde musician and film-maker.
Hazarika, hailing from Guwahati, Assam, is a pioneer of electronica/industrial/avant-garde music in Northeast India.

Axl Hazarika made his official VEVO debut on 27 June ’13 with the exclusive release of the music video of his hit Indian song ‘Hum Badal Gaye’.

Axl Hazarika started an EDM project called Rainbow Trip in late 2015 with the release of a psytrance set “Trippy Experience” on SoundCloud, which hit the top of SoundCloud Trance charts within a month and stayed at #1 for 12 consecutive weeks.

Axl released the first Assamese folk EDM song Goru Bihu Song as Rainbow Trip in May 2016. The music video amassed over 1 lakhs (100,000) views within the first week of release.

Biography

Born and brought up in Guwahati, Assam, Axl Hazarika started his musical career in 2008. He released his album Elektrokore in 2008, which comprised the first Assamese metal song ever - Joi Aai Axom.

Axl was the first to compose and release metal songs in his regional language - Assamese. The song Joi Aai Axom is a voice against terrorism that has occurred in Assam. Matribhoomi, another single was released following the 2008 Assam bombings, dedicated to the departed souls. Another hit single is B-deshi, a song against the illegal immigrants in Assam. Jai Shiv Shankara and Maha Kali are a fusion of Sanskrit shlokas, metal and electronic music

In 2008, Axl Hazarika formed an industrial metal project called Elektrokore. He released several songs as Elektrokore.

On 1 January 2012, Axl Hazarika released an animation film titled Hum Badal Gaye. Directed by Ryan Hazarika, it is also the first animation film from Northeast India. The storyline of the film focuses on the relationship between a boy and his pet cat. The soundtrack (OST) of the film was released on 14 February 2012.

On 26 January 2012, Axl Hazarika released his solo album titled Elektrokore 1, which is the first industrial music album from northeast India.

Career

Rainbow Trip 

Axl formed an EDM project Rainbow Trip with  sister Noms Hazarika in late 2015. Their first work was a psytrance set “Trippy Experience” that topped SoundCloud Trance charts for 12 consecutive weeks and still remains in the top 50 with over 7 million plays. Rainbow Trip released their debut music video Goru Bihu Song on 27 May 2016. Goru Bihu Song is the first Assamese folk EDM song.

Discography

Albums 
 Deadcall (2006)
 Elektrokore (2008)
 Elektrokore – EP (2009)
 Elektrokore 1 (2012)

Singles 
 Composed Reality, Drug+love, Trapt, Wrong & Di-Vine torture from the album ‘Vine Dead Straw’ (2007)
 Maatribhoomi (2008)
 Sacrifice (2010)
 Jai Shiv Shankara (2010)
 Maha Kali (2010)
 Hum Badal Gaye (OST) (2012)
 Prisoner In Me (2012)
 Hum Badal Gaye (Official Music Video) (2013)
 B-Deshi (2014)
 Goru Bihu Song (2016)

References

External links
 Axl Hazarika Official Website
  Axl Hazarika Official Official VEVO Page at VEVO
 

Year of birth missing (living people)
Living people
Singers from Assam
Musicians from Guwahati
Indian male playback singers
Indian male singer-songwriters
Indian singer-songwriters
Indian male pop singers
Assamese playback singers
Indian record producers